, full name  and also known as , is a Japanese professional football club based in Chiba, capital of Chiba Prefecture. They currently play in the J2 League, Japanese second tier of professional football.

History

Furukawa Electric SC (1946–1991) 
The club began as the company team,  in 1946. As the company team, it won the Japan Soccer League twice, the Emperor's Cup four times and the JSL League Cup three times. Furukawa also won the 1986–87 Asian Club Championship, the top club honor in Asia; they were the first Japanese club to do so.

The club was a founding member ("Original Eight") of the Japan Soccer League (JSL) in 1965. Since the league's inception, the club had always played in the top flight in Japan and was the only Japanese club to never be relegated from the JSL Division 1, a record they kept into the J1 years. They did finish the 1978 season in a relegation position (last of 10) but stayed up after beating Honda FC 1–0 on aggregate in a two-legged playoff. The last place was not automatically relegated until the 1980 season.

JEF United Ichihara (1992–2004) 
In 1991, it merged with the JR East's company team to become  and rebranded itself as JEF United Ichihara upon the J.League's founding in 1993. JEF United Ichihara was an original member ("Original Ten") of the J.League in 1993. The club initially built itself around the former Germany national football team player Pierre Littbarski.

From 1998 to 2000, the club struggled to stay in the J.League and it began a series of efforts to be a competitive team. Since the hiring of Ivica Osim in 2003, JEF United has contended for the league title each year despite limited resources and struggling attendance.

JEF United Chiba (2005–) 
On 1 February 2005, the club changed its name from JEF United Ichihara to the current name after Chiba city had joined Ichihara, Chiba as its hometown in 2003. Of its club name, JEF is taken from the JR East and Furukawa Electric companies and United is meant to represent the unity of the club and its home city. Also, JEF United is the only team in J.League which corporate name survived the transition from the JSL in 1992, as J.League mandated that "corporate teams are not allowed in the J.League", and that any corporate teams need to adapt a hometown.

On 16 July 2006, Osim left the club to take over the coach of the Japan national team and was succeeded by Amar Osim, his son and assistant coach.
On December 5, 2007, it was announced that Amar Osim had been sacked after the club's lowly 13th-place finish in the 2007 season.

After 13 games in the 2008 season Josip Kuže was sacked as team manager. On 8 May 2008 it was announced that the new manager was Alex Miller. Miller was First Team Coach at Liverpool F.C. alongside Rafael Benítez prior to joining JEF United.

The Furukawa Electric is no longer the main sponsor of the club, a job these days taken over by Fuji Electric.

On November 8, 2009, JEF United Chiba was relegated to J2 after 44 seasons in the Japanese top division; since 2010, JEF United Chiba is playing in J.League Division 2.

JEF United Chiba was close to being promoted to J.League Division 1 during the 2012 season. The club was considered one of the favorites to be directly promoted to J1. However, after defeats to clubs considered lesser than them such as FC Gifu and F.C. Machida Zelvia, JEF played the playoffs, making their road to the final. They defeated Yokohama FC by 4–0, but lost the final match to Oita Trinita by 1–0, at Tokyo National Stadium.

In the 2013 season they played in the promotion to J1 playoffs. They lost the semi final match to Tokushima Vortis by 1–1(Chiba was 6th place and Tokushima was 3rd place in the league, regulation decides up high club can go final even draw.)

In the 2014 season they played in the promotion playoffs to J1 again. The club did not have to play in the semi-final(Chiba was 4th place but the 3rd place club named Giravanz Kitakyushu had a J League original stadium problem so Kitakyushu could not go to the promotion play off). In the final against Montedio Yamagata, they lost by 0–1, at Ajinomoto Stadium.

The club will play their 14th consecutive season at the J2 on 2023.

Symbols

Stadiums 

It had played its home matches at Ichihara Seaside Stadium, but has since moved to the larger, football-specific and more conveniently located Fukuda Denshi Arena, which opened in Chiba during the 2005 season. The club had initially practiced at Urayasu, Chiba planning to base itself in Narashino, Chiba before opposition by those living around Akitsu Stadium forced it to be based in Ichihara. Since 2000, training has been held at Footpark Anesaki in Ichihara in normally.
Since 1 October 2009, they made new practice place UNITED PARK near the Fukuda Denshi Arena.

Mascot 

JEF United Ichihara's mascot characters are Akita Inu brothers named Jeffy and Unity.  The squad number of Jeffy is 2 and that of Unity is 9. They are also joined by a third mascot named Mina, or Mina-chan. Her backstory was that she one day came to Soga Station (the railway station nearest to Fukuda Denshi Arena) and offered to work alongside Jeffy and Unity. Her squad number is 12.

Slogan 
JEF United considers its philosophy to be encapsulated in its tagline "Win By All"  since 2001.

Affiliated clubs

Furukawa Electric Chiba 
This was JEF's reserve team during the JSL years. They were formed in 1967 and were first promoted to the JSL Second Division in 1975. They still exist, although they are no longer affiliated on paper, and play in the Kanto Regional League. In 2008 they renamed themselves S.A.I. Ichihara and in 2011 they adopted the name Vonds Ichihara. Now separate from Furukawa Electric control, they aim to form its power base in Ichihara as JEF is now based in Chiba city.

JEF Reserves 
JEF's reserve team played until 2011 in the Japan Football League, the third tier of Japanese football.  But in 2011, the club announced the end of the B team because of financial problems.

JEF United Chiba Ladies

Rivalries

Marunouchi Gosanke 
Historically, JEF United's fiercest rivals have been Kashiwa Reysol and Urawa Reds, both close neighbors. The three were co-founders ("Original Eight") of the Japan Soccer League (JSL) in 1965, and spent most seasons in the top tier through the JSL era. Because of their former parent companies' headquarters being all based in Marunouchi, Tokyo, the three clubs were known as the Marunouchi Gosanke (丸の内御三家) and fixtures among them were known as the Marunouchi derbies.

Chiba derby 
JEF United and Reysol first met in 1941 in ancient Kanto regional football league. The two clubs both now based in Chiba Prefecture, and their rivalry is known as the Chiba derby. They annually contest a pre-season friendly match well known as the Chibagin Cup (i.e., Chiba Bank Cup) since 1995.

Record as J.League member 

Key

Honours 
As Furukawa Electric SC (1946–1992), JEF United Ichihara (1992–2004), and JEF United Chiba (2005–present)

National

League
JSL Division 1
Champions (2): 1976, 1985

Cups
JSL Cup / J.League Cup
Winners (5): 1977, 1982, 1986,  2005, 2006
Emperor's Cup
Winners (4): 1960, 1961, 1964 (shared), 1976
Japanese Super Cup
Winners (1): 1977
All Japan Works Football Championship
Winners (3): 1959, 1961, 1962 (shared)
All Japan Inter-City Football Championship
Winners (4): 1959, 1960, 1961, 1964

International
Asian Club Championship
Winners (1): 1986

League history 
Division 1 (JSL Div. 1): 1965–1992
Division 1 (J1): 1993–2009
Division 2 (J2): 2010–present

Players

Current squad 
As of 13 March 2023.

Out on loan

International capped players

Coaching staff

Managerial history

Kit and colours 
The club colours of JEF United Chiba are yellow, green and red.

Kit evolution

Notes

References

External Links. 

 Official website 

 
J.League clubs
Japan Soccer League clubs
Football clubs in Japan
Association football clubs established in 1946
1946 establishments in Japan
Emperor's Cup winners
Japanese League Cup winners
Sports teams in Chiba Prefecture
AFC Champions League winning clubs